Luck is a 2022 computer-animated fantasy comedy film directed by Peggy Holmes and co-directed by Javier Abad, from a screenplay written by Kiel Murray, and a story by Murray and the writing team of Jonathan Aibel and Glenn Berger, based on an original concept created by Rebeca Carrasco, Juan De Dios, and Julián Romero. Produced by Skydance Animation, the film features the voices of Eva Noblezada, Simon Pegg, Jane Fonda, Whoopi Goldberg, Flula Borg, Lil Rel Howery, Colin O'Donoghue, and John Ratzenberger. Set in the Land of Luck, the story follows the unluckiest person named Sam Greenfield (Noblezada), as she must unite with an anthropomorphic cat named Bob (Pegg) to turn her luck around.

The project was announced in July 2017, shortly after Skydance Animation was formed in March 2017, with Paramount Pictures distributing as the schedule for March 2021. Luck was subsequently green-lighted by Paramount Animation chief Mireille Soria in April 2018, with Alessandro Carloni signed on to direct the film, from a script by Aibel and Berger. The film since underwent many changes, such as rewrites, directors, and release dates, and Holmes was later announced as the new director in January 2020, replacing Carloni. Much of the main voice cast, including Noblezada, and Pegg, signed on in January 2022, following the casting of Fonda and Goldberg in February and June 2021. Production was done remotely during the COVID-19 pandemic.

Luck premiered in Madrid on August 2, 2022, and was on Apple TV+ and in select theaters in the United States on August 5, 2022. The film received mixed reviews from critics with praise for the voice acting, music, and animation, but criticism for the worldbuilding and plot.

Plot

Sam Greenfield is a clumsy, orphaned young woman whose life has been constantly plagued by misfortune and has recently been forced out from her foster home the Summerland Home For Girls, much to the dismay of her younger friend/foster sister Hazel, who is hoping to be adopted soon. One night, after sharing a panini with a black cat, she finds a penny she hopes to give to Hazel for her collection of other lucky items to help her get adopted. The next day, Sam notices that the penny has made her luck significantly improve. However, she soon loses the penny by inadvertently flushing it down a toilet.

As Sam bemoans her error, she encounters the cat again and tells him what happened, which causes the cat to berate her for losing the penny. Shocked, Sam follows the cat through a portal to the Land of Luck, where creatures like leprechauns create good luck for the people on Earth. The cat, named Bob, tells Sam he needs the penny for traveling purposes and that he will be banished if word gets out that he lost it. Bob and Sam make a deal to get another penny from the Penny depot for Hazel to use before returning it to Bob. Bob uses a button from Sam to pass off as a penny while she sneaks into the Land of Luck using clothes belonging to Bob's personal leprechaun, Gerry. Throughout the journey, Sam comes to learn how the good luck is managed by a dragon, and that bad luck is managed underneath the Land of Luck.

Following a disaster at the Penny depot which causes Gerry to learn about Sam's identity, Gerry uses a drone to retrieve the missing penny on Earth but the drone gets lost in the In-Between, a space between the Good and Bad Luck lands. Sam and Bob go to the In-Between, which is managed by a unicorn named Jeff. Jeff manages a machine called the Bad Luck Apparat that keeps bad luck specks from sticking which feeds the Randomizer, another machine that sends both good and bad luck into Earth. Jeff tells the pair he found the penny and has returned it to the depot. Not deterred, Sam decides to visit the dragon in hopes to get another penny. The dragon, named Babe, shares a moment with Sam by telling her how better things would be everyone had good luck before giving her a new penny. But Sam sacrifices her penny after Bob is caught for faking his travel penny to spare him from banishment.

Still wanting to help Hazel, Sam and Bob decide to temporarily shut down the Bad Luck Apparat to prevent bad luck from going to the Randomizer and give Hazel the luck she needs to get adopted. However, the bad luck specks start to clog Jeff's machines and destroy the good luck and bad luck stones within the Randomizer, which itself brings bad luck to the Land of Luck and Earth. Seeing Hazel did not get adopted because of this, Sam sulks in remorse. Bob tells Sam that Hazel is the luckiest girl for having Sam at her side. Sam realizes things can be fixed because she remembers seeing some good luck in Bad Luck land while on her way to the In-Between.

Back in Bad Luck, they find it in a tiki bar where the bartender, a root monster named Rootie, gives them a jar of good luck they have been using. They take it to Babe to forge new good and bad luck stones. However, while Babe creates a bad luck stone, she creates two good luck stones, wanting to create a world with only good luck. Before she can place them, Sam tells Babe people need bad luck as much as good luck. Realizing her mistake, she allows Sam to place the bad luck stone, and  good luck is restored to normal, where Sam sees Hazel finally getting adopted by a new family. Bob is offered to keep his job at the Land of Luck, but decides he wants to live with Sam.

One year later back on Earth, Hazel's family spends time with Sam and Bob as Sam has finally accepted her bad luck.

Voice cast
 Eva Noblezada as Sam Greenfield, an unlucky person who discovers the Land of Luck and must unite with magical creatures there to turn her luck around
 Simon Pegg as Bob, an anthropomorphic, short haired black cat with a Scottish accent who becomes Sam's partner for the journey
 Jane Fonda as Babe, a female dragon who acts as the exuberant CEO of Good Luck and undisputed luckiest ancient being in all the land
 Whoopi Goldberg as The Captain, a leprechaun who acts as the Land of Luck's head of security
 Flula Borg as Jeff, a German-accented unicorn who works as the facilities engineer maintaining the luck distributing machine
 Lil Rel Howery as Marvin, Sam's upbeat boss who runs an arts and crafts shop
 Colin O'Donoghue as Gerry, a leprechaun who works with Bob
 John Ratzenberger as Rootie, a root monster who runs a tiki bar and the self-appointed Mayor of Bad Luck
 Grey DeLisle as Mrs. Rivera, Saoirse and the Penny Depot boss
 Suzy Nakamura as a social worker
 Kwaku Fortune as Gael
 Adelynn Spoon as Hazel, Sam's best friend and roommate at the Summerland Home For Girls
 Kari Wahlgren as Hazel's adoptive mother and Aine
 Nick Thurston as Hazel's adoptive father
 Thurston also voices a nosy cat
 Chris Edgerly as a typing Bunny
 Moe Irvin as Phil the Pig Foreman
 Fred Tatasciore as Quinn and Fred

Production

Development
In March 2017, Skydance Media formed a multi-year partnership with Madrid-based animation studio Ilion Animation Studios, forming an animation division called Skydance Animation. In July, it announced Luck. It would be distributed by Paramount Pictures as part of their deal with Skydance Media and was given a release date of March 19, 2021. In April 2018, Luck was greenlit by then-Paramount Animation chief Mireille Soria, and Alessandro Carloni signed on to direct the film, from a script by Jonathan Aibel and Glenn Berger based on an original concept by Rebeca Carrasco, Juan De Dios and Julián Romero. Luck had been in development at Ilion before forming its deal with Skydance. Skydance Animation hired former Pixar Animation Studios and Walt Disney Animation Studios CCO John Lasseter in late January 2019, as Head of Animation.

Following Lasseter's hiring, Soria announced that Paramount Animation would no longer work with Skydance Animation. Luck was still going to be released by Paramount Pictures without Paramount Animation until Apple TV+ acquired the distribution rights to it in December 2020. Apple Original Films would replace Paramount as a production company. On January 14, 2020, Carloni was replaced by Peggy Holmes, who had previously directed Secret of the Wings (2012) and The Pirate Fairy (2014) for Lasseter, as the film's director. Kiel Murray, screenwriter for Cars (2006) and Cars 3 (2017), was also hired to rewrite the screenplay, turning it into a workplace fantasy comedy similar to Monsters, Inc. through Aibel and Berger were still credited for the story co-written by Murray.

One of the core inspirations when researching the myths about luck is the main character Sam, having her in foster care to find her forever family. The main inspiration for Sam and her unluckyness came from television shows such as I Love Lucy and The Carol Burnett Show, along with other inspiration from Charlie Chaplin, Buster Keaton and Donald O'Connor. In researching luck, workers at Skydance Animation discovered how obsessed people are with the concept, along with some interesting reversals, including how it became random by good and bad luck. For example, black cats are considered good luck in Scotland, which led them to create Bob. By the end of the film, he is revealed to be English as black cats are considered bad luck in England. The land of Luck was designed by production designer Fred Warner to explain both sides being put of a coin.

Casting
In April 2019, Emma Thompson was hired to voice a character in the film, but left the project after Lasseter was hired. In February 2021, Jane Fonda was cast as The Dragon, and in June, Whoopi Goldberg was cast as The Captain. Other cast members were announced in January 2022, including Eva Noblezada, Simon Pegg Flula Borg, Lil Rel Howery, Colin O'Donoghue, John Ratzenberger and Adelynn Spoon.

Animation
Animation was provided by Skydance Animation Madrid (formerly Ilion Animation Studios) and was also made in Los Angeles and Connecticut. Portions of production were done remotely during the COVID-19 pandemic.

Music

Tanya Donelly and Mt. Joy were originally attached to compose the score for the film, while William J. Caparella served as lead editor. However, on November 15, 2021, it was announced that composer John Debney replaced them as composer. Noblezada did a cover of "Lucky Star" with additional vocals by Alana Da Fonseca, for the film's soundtrack by Milan Records.

Release
Luck was released to Apple TV+ and in select theaters in the United States on August 5, 2022. The film was originally set to be released in theaters on March 19, 2021 by Paramount Pictures, but was delayed to February 18, 2022. On May 8, 2020, Skydance Animation president Holly Edwards revealed that the rough cut would have test screenings late in the summer of 2020.  On December 16, 2020, Apple TV+ secured the distribution rights to the film, with it retaining the February date, before getting delayed to its current release date.

Reception

Critical response
 

Peter Bradshaw from The Guardian rated the film two stars out of five, describing the script as "utterly zingless and contorted."

Accolades

Short film
On March 17, 2023 in celebrating of St. Patrick’s Day, AppleTV+ released a short film titled Bad Luck Spot!, directed by Matt Youngberg. It shows the Hazmat bunnies trying to get rid off a single bad luck crystal.

References

External links

2022 films
2020s American animated films
2020s English-language films
2022 comedy films
2022 computer-animated films
American adventure comedy films
American children's animated comedy films
American children's animated fantasy films
American computer-animated films
Animated films about cats
Animated films about dragons
Apple TV+ original films
English-language Spanish films
Films directed by Peggy Holmes
Films produced by John Lasseter
Films impacted by the COVID-19 pandemic
Films scored by John Debney
Skydance Media films
Skydance Animation films
Spanish adventure comedy films
Spanish computer-animated films
Spanish fantasy films
Animated films about orphans